The Natural History Museum of the Lesvos Petrified Forest is a geological museum located in the village of Sigri on the island of Lesbos in Greece. Established in 1994, it is a center for the study, management, and preservation of the petrified forest of Lesbos and for public education about the site. It is a founding member of the European Geoparks Network and is a member of UNESCO's Global Geoparks Network.

References

External links
Official site

Buildings and structures in Lesbos
Natural history museums in Greece
Museums in the North Aegean
Geology museums in Greece